The Divan Istanbul is a five star hotel in  Istanbul, Turkey. It is located next to Taksim Gezi Park in Elmadağ, Şişli, in walking distance from Taksim Square. Opened in 1956, it is the flagship of the Divan Group hotel chain.

During the 2013 protests in Turkey it opened to injured protestors as well as those fleeing police attacks. During the night of 15/16 June, police repeatedly tear-gassed the lobby. As a result, according to Turkish  Prime Minister Recep Tayyip Erdoğan, the hotel had helped criminals.

See also
 Koç family
 Koç Holding
 Gezi Park protests

References

External links
 
 Otele gaz bombası atılma anı, 16 June 2013

Hotels in Istanbul
Hotels established in 1956
Hotel buildings completed in 1956
Şişli
Turkish companies established in 1956